The Mandatory World Tour (also known as the Return of the Mandatory World Tour) is the 12th concert tour by American recording artist, "Weird Al" Yankovic. Launched in 2015, the tour supports the singer's 14th studio album, Mandatory Fun (2014).  Running for two years, the tour played nearly 200 shows in North America, Europe and Australasia.

Background 
Yankovic announced the tour in January 2015 via his Twitter account. The tweet featured a 30-second ad, styled as a propaganda film, calling the show, "the greatest musical spectacle ever seen". The tour predominately played in the United States, with a handful of dates in Canada, Europe, Australia and New Zealand. Along with standalone gigs, Yankovic also played music festivals, state and county fairs. At the end of 2015, the tour placed 122nd on Pollstar's annual year end list, earning 8.2 million. In 2016, the singer added additional shows marked as the "Return of the Mandatory World Tour". Yankovic remarked many fans were upset that he didn't play certain territories, stating: "They forgot the show was mandatory". The shows in 2016 placed 159th on Pollstar's annual year end list, making $7.1 million, bringing the total earned to $15.3 million.

Critical reception
Along with its commercial success, the tour received praise from critics and spectators of the concerts.

In Cary, David Menconi (The News & Observer) stated Yankovic makes being funny look easy. He says: "People still turn out for Yankovic because he's incredibly skilled at crafting cultural time-capsules starring himself. He's also about the last word in appealing adolescent silliness; my 16-year-old son came along, and he loved it."

Ashley Belanger (Orlando Weekly) writes Yankovic was a great showman despite the humorous material. For the show in Orlando, she wrote: "'Weird Al' was a live wire. I found my eyes flitting around to follow his every move, like I was a freaking cat watching a laser pointer. Not only did he do costume changes nearly every song, but his whole band played along by switching get-ups too, with enough change-ups to wonder if backstage looked like a teen girl's bedroom with cast-off garments covering every surface."

The show in London received three out of five stars. Brian Logan (The Guardian) writes: "The experience is more akin to watching a tribute band, where the homage being paid is tongue-in-cheek, if scarcely less affectionate, and the source material extends to every major pop song since the early 80s. Highlights include a swing version of Yankovic's breakout Michael Jackson pastiche Eat It, and his Star Wars/Don McLean mashup The Saga Begins, replete with stormtroopers. Throughout, Yankovic's voice is strong, whether he's aping Kurt Cobain or crooning barbershop with his excellent band. The personal touch is lacking, but there's no denying, Weird Al gives good show."

Cory Garcia (Houston Press) writes the show was given a different vibe in the Brown Theatre. He says: "The surroundings made the show feel bigger physically and on a metaphorical level. It feels weird to label what Weird Al does live as a concert because it feels much more than that. Over his career, Weird Al Yankovic has earned his place in fancy theater venues; yes, his art may be writing food-centric parodies of pop songs, but he is the Shakespeare of that art. So, maybe I've had it backward before; it's not that Al is worthy of playing the Wortham; it's that the Wortham is worthy of hosting Al."

Danny Gallagher (Dallas Observer) stated the show at the Winspear Opera House was a repeat success of the show in October 2015. He goes on to say: "The focus of his show is on the music, even if he's performing purely for laughs. It's a tightly constructed and executed set list that not only included multiple instruments and heavy multimedia interaction but also wardrobe changes and even some special prosthetic makeup."

Setlist 
The following setlist was obtained from the concert held on May 15, 2015, at the PH Showroom in Las Vegas, Nevada. It does not represent all concerts for the duration of the tour.
"Tacky"
"Lame Claim to Fame"
"NOW That's What I Call Polka!"
"Perform This Way"
"Dare To Be Stupid"
"Fat"
"First World Problems"
"Foil"
"Smells Like Nirvana"
"Party In The CIA" / "It's All About The Pentiums" / "Handy" / "Bedrock Anthem" / "Another One Rides the Bus" / "Ode to a Superhero" / "Gump" / "Inactive" / "eBay" / "Canadian Idiot"
"Wanna B Ur Lovr"
"Eat It" / "I Lost on Jeopardy" / "I Love Rocky Road" / "Like a Surgeon"
"White & Nerdy"
"Word Crimes"
"Amish Paradise"
Encore
"The Saga Begins"
"Yoda"

Tour dates

Festivals and other miscellaneous performances

This concert was a part of the "Governors Ball Music Festival"
This concert was a part of "Summerfest"
This concert was a part of the "National Cherry Festival"
This concert was a part of the "RBC Royal Bank Ottawa Bluesfest"
This concert was a part of "Just for Laughs"
This concert was a part of the "Machias Savings Bank Concert Series"
This concert was a part of the "Del Mar Summer Concert Series"
This concert was a part of the "Britt Music and Arts Festival"
This concert was a part of the "Columbia Bank Concert Series"
This concert was a part of the "Falls Music & Arts Festival"
This concert was a part of the "Bay City River Roar"
This concert was a part of "Zootunes"
This concert was a part of the "Red Butte Garden Outdoor Concert Series"
This concert was a part of the "Sturgis Motorcycle Rally"
This concert was a part of the "Lowell Summer Music Series"

Cancellations and rescheduled shows

Box office score data

References

2015 concert tours
2016 concert tours
Concert tours of Canada
Concert tours of Europe
Concert tours of Oceania
Concert tours of the United States
"Weird Al" Yankovic concert tours